Madame Tussauds Hong Kong, is part of the renowned chain of wax museums founded by Marie Tussaud of France, is located at the Peak Tower on Hong Kong Island in Hong Kong. It is the first Madame Tussauds museums in Asia, the other being the Shanghai branch, which opened in 2006 and the third branch at Bangkok which opened in 2010. The Hong Kong branch houses nearly 100 wax figures of internationally known personalities, with Asian figures taking up more than a third of the total, of which sixteen were Hong Kongers. The wax figures are featured in a range of themed settings such as Hong Kong Glamour, Music Icons, Historical and National Heroes, The Champions and World Premiere.

History

In the late 1990s, Madame Tussauds had outlets spanning worldwide in major cities such as London, Amsterdam and Las Vegas, but none in the Asia-Pacific region. When the "Madame Tussaud's Touring Attraction" ran in Singapore and Australia, proving to be highly popular, the Tussauds Group decided to open a permanent outlet in Asia to cater to such demand, and Hong Kong was chosen for its proximity to the Asian markets.

Madame Tussauds Hong Kong opened at The Peak in 2000, and features nearly 100 wax figures of internationally known personalities and local celebrities to date – with Asian figures taking up more than a third of the total, of which sixteen were Hong Kongers. Asian celebrities and superstars have often graced the unveiling of their wax likenesses with sizeable groups of their fans tagging along. In September 2005, it began its renovation in its effort to bring an interactive and immersive entertainment experience to visitors. It re-opened at a cost of HK$20 million (US$2.6 million) on 18 May 2006, adding a further  of exhibition space on three floors and five themed areas. Visitors can journey through the attraction, stopping to mingle with the 'stars' in a range of themed settings including Hong Kong Glamour, Music Icons, Historical and National Heroes, The Champions and World Premiere.

As of 2008, the museum is headed by Bret Pidgeon, who is currently the general manager of Madame Tussauds Hong Kong and Shanghai. He has worked for eight years for Madame Tussauds in New York previously. The museum is accessible from Central via minibus, taxi or Peak Tram and opens all year round from 10 am to 10 pm daily. Admission fee is HK$140 (US$18) for adults and HK$70 for children aged between 3 and 11 years old.

Wax figure making process

In over one or more sittings, a highly skilled sculptor from Madame Tussauds Studios who is given direct access to the celebrity will record the colours of the hair and eyes, and over 500 precise body measurements are referenced. Most important is to capture the look of the celebrity to reflect the personality of each unique individual. The next task is to make a clay model of the head and body which is used to create a mould. Wax cast of the head and hands are made from the mould, and the eyes are inserted. Each eye is hand-painted to achieve a perfect match of the original. Real human hair is then inserted painstakingly strand by strand.

The head and hands are coloured using a blend of oil, water and acrylic colour. From the mould, the body is cast in fibreglass, and the head and hands are fitted to the fiberglass body and dressed in clothes that are often donated by the celebrity. The pose, clothes and expression on the face all contribute to making the figure as realistic as possible. The whole process usually takes up to six months by a team of 20 people to create and cost about HK$1 million each.

Unique figures
 The figure of Miriam Yeung, unveiled in November 2006, is the first in the world designed to giggle via in-built sensors. Miriam is well known for her fun-loving and bubbly personality, and Madame Tussauds want to capture that essence in her figure.
 The figure of Connie Chan, unveiled in August 2006, was the first figure to appear in full Chinese regalia. The model's costume was inspired by the musical Only You, set in the Yuan Dynasty, in which Chan formerly starred.
 The figure of Bae Yong-joon, unveiled in May 2006, is the first Korean star to be included in a Madame Tussauds exhibition.
 The figure of Andy Lau, unveiled in April 2005, was the outlet first animatronic model that was crafted out of silicone rather than wax. Lau's animatronic heartbeat was modelled on a similar system installed in a replica of Brad Pitt at Madame Tussauds Amsterdam.

Featured personalities
The list of featured celebrities sorted according to on-site themes are:

Hong Kong Glamour 
Jackie Chan
Jay Chou
Bruce Lee
Michelle Yeoh
Ayumi Hamasaki
Brad Pitt
Cher
Eddie Murphy
Elle Macpherson
Gérard Depardieu
Hugh Grant
Joanna Lumley
Kelly Chen
Mel Gibson
Meryl Streep
Naomi Campbell
Cecilia Cheung
Aaron Kwok
Leo Ku (added on 4 April 2007)
Janice Vidal (added on 18 July 2007)
Angelina Jolie (added on 27 Sep 2007)
Donnie Yen (added on 30 April 2010)
Jet Li (added on 28 Sep 2010)
Kim Woo-bin (added on 22 Sep 2018)
Pia Wurtzbach (The First Filipino Wax Figure to join the list on 25 March 2019)
Jackson Wang (added on 29 July 2019)

The Sports Champions

David Beckham
Lee Lai Shan
Muhammad Ali
Yao Ming
Chiyonofuji Mitsugu
Liu Xiang
Tiger Woods
Ronaldinho (added in December 2007)
Stephen Curry
Manny Pacquiao (The 2nd Filipino Celebrity Wax Figure Added On November 24, 2021)

Historical figures and national heroes
Diana, Princess of Wales
Luciano Pavarotti
Mahatma Gandhi
Nelson Mandela
Bill Clinton
George W. Bush
Barack Obama (added on 20 Jan 2009)
Mikhail Gorbachev
Saddam Hussein
The Duke of Edinburgh
Elizabeth II
The Prince of Wales
The Princess Royal
The Duke of Cambridge (added on 7 Aug 2007)
Adolf Hitler
Sir Winston Churchill
Rembrandt van Rijn
Pablo Picasso
Wolfgang Amadeus Mozart
Deng Xiaoping
Jiang Zemin
Li Ka Shing
Lee Kuan Yew
Shigeru Yoshida
Hu Jintao
Albert Einstein
John Howard
Marie Tussaud
Sun Yat-sen (added in July 2007)
Mao Zedong (added in July 2007)
Yang Liwei (added in July 2007)
Donald Tsang (added on 7 April 2008)
Narendra Modi
Sukarno (became the second statue of Sukarno, the first statue of Sukarno was in Madame Tussauds Bangkok, added on 5 June 2014)
Joko Widodo(He became the fourth Indonesian wax figure on added on 1 May 2017'')
William Shakespeare
Donald Trump (added on 26 April 2018)

World premiere
Elizabeth Taylor
Benny Hill
Pierce Brosnan
Andy Lau
Leon Lai
Anthony Hopkins
Jodie Foster
Harrison Ford
Humphrey Bogart
Macaulay Culkin
Marilyn Monroe
Alfred Hitchcock
Bae Yong-joon
Connie Chan
Amitabh Bachchan
Bruce Lee
Lee Jong-suk
Suzy
Benedict Cumberbatch

Music icons
Leslie Cheung
Anita Mui
Elvis Presley
Freddie Mercury
Lady Gaga
Madonna
Michael Jackson
Mick Jagger
Miriam Yeung
Teresa Teng
The Beatles
Tina Turner
Twins
Joey Yung
G.E.M.
TVXQ
Ariana Grande

Madame Tussauds Shanghai
The second Asian outlet is located in the Chinese city of Shanghai. Attracted by Shanghai's growing reputation and tourism volume in East Asia, the Tussauds Group approached Shanghai authorities to discuss the possibility of opening its second Asian location in early 2004. The Shanghai authorities agreed with the proposal and Madame Tussauds Shanghai (上海杜莎夫人臘像館) was opened on 1 May 2006 on the 10th floor of the New World Department Store at West Nanjing Road.

The Shanghai outlet houses nearly 75 wax figures of local and internationally known celebrities to date, and will add more in its second and third phases. The museum opens all year round from 10 am to 10 pm daily and it is divided up into seven themed sections: Glamour, Behind the Scenes, History and Heroes, Music, Film, Speed and Sport. Admission fee is RMB 135 (US$20) for adults and RMB 100 for students. Madame Tussauds Shanghai is the Tussauds Group's sixth waxwork museum after London, Amsterdam, Las Vegas, New York City and Hong Kong.

See also

Peak Galleria
Tourism in Hong Kong

References

External links

Official Site
Press Clippings: May 2006 — Present (English and Chinese)
A video clip on Madame Tussauds Hong Kong

Hong Kong
Museums in Hong Kong
Victoria Peak
Tourist attractions in Hong Kong